DNA-directed RNA polymerase I subunit RPA12 is an enzyme that in humans is encoded by the ZNRD1 gene.

Function 

This gene encodes a protein with similarity to the Saccharomyces cerevisiae Rpa12p subunit of RNA polymerase I. Alternate splicing of this gene results in two transcript variants encoding the same protein. Additional splice variants have been described, but their full-length sequences have not been determined.

References

Further reading